The Girls' 10m platform at diving at the 2010 Summer Youth Olympics was held on August 21 at 20:30. 12 competitors featured in this event. Earlier that day there were the preliminaries to determine the finalists (13:30 local time).

Medalists

Results

References
 Preliminary Results
 Final Results

Diving at the 2010 Summer Youth Olympics
Youth